Laufen railway station is a railway station in the municipality of Laufen, in the Swiss canton of Basel-Landschaft. It is an intermediate stop on the Basel–Biel/Bienne line and is served by local and long-distance trains.

Services

Long-distance 
The following long-distance trains call at Laufen:

 InterCity: hourly service from Biel/Bienne to Basel SBB.

Local 
Laufen is served by the S3 of the Basel S-Bahn:

 : hourly service to Porrentruy and half-hourly service to Olten.

References

External links 
 

Railway stations in Basel-Landschaft
Swiss Federal Railways stations